Antonio de Bellis (c. 1616 – c. 1656) was an Italian painter from Naples, active in the Baroque period. Along with Jusepe de Ribera, Bernardo Cavallino and Massimo Stanzioni he was one of the major artists working in Naples in the first half of the seventeenth century, under the influence of the painter Caravaggio.

Life and work

He worked on the paintings on the Life of St. Charles in the church of San Carlo alle Mortelle in Naples. Other autograph works are the Scene of a sacrifice in the Museum of Fine Arts, Houston, Finding of Moses in the National Gallery, London and The Liberation of St. Peter in the Smith College Museum of Art.

There are two works known that are signed with the artist's monogram ADB, one in a private collection and the other is Rest on the Flight into Egypt at Whitfield Fine Art, London.

References

1610s births
17th-century Neapolitan people
17th-century Italian painters
Italian male painters
Italian Baroque painters
Painters from Naples
1650s deaths